Original Thornton/88th station (sometimes stylized as Original Thornton•88th) is a station on the N Line of the Denver RTD commuter rail system in Thornton, Colorado. It is located north of 88th Avenue and west of Welby Road; a section of Welby was moved  to a new alignment linear with Steele Street. The station opened on September 21, 2020.

References 

RTD commuter rail stations
Railway stations in the United States opened in 2020
2020 establishments in Colorado
Thornton, Colorado